Murat Halstead (September 2, 1829 – July 2, 1908) was an American newspaper editor and magazine writer. He was a war correspondent during three wars.

Biography
Born in Paddy's Run (now Shandon), Ohio, in Butler County, Ohio, he was the son of Griffin Halstead, a farmer. With his mother's help, he was a reader by the time he was four, and during his boyhood read works such as Plutarch's Lives, Josephus, Revolutions in Europe and Charles Rollin's Ancient History. He spent the summers on his father's farm and the winters in school until he was nineteen years old, and, after teaching for a few months, in 1848 entered Farmer's College, near Cincinnati, where he graduated in 1851. He then decided to study law.

He had begun writing for newspapers when he was 18, writing for The Hamilton Intelligencer and The Roseville Democrat, two Butler Country papers. While a student near Cincinnati, he contributed to the Commercial and especially to the literary department of the Gazette. After leaving college, he became connected with the Cincinnati Atlas, and then with the Enquirer. He afterward established a Sunday newspaper in Cincinnati, and from 1852–1853 worked on the Columbian and Great West, a weekly. He began work on the Commercial on March 8, 1853, as a local reporter, and soon became news editor. The following year, he acquired a pecuniary interest in the paper, which began rapidly to increase in circulation and influence. He personally reported several battles during the Civil War. He was also a war correspondent for the Franco-Prussian War, where he sided emphatically with the Germans.

In 1867, he acquired a controlling interest in the Commercial. After pursuing for a time a course of independent journalism, he allied himself with the Republican Party. The Cincinnati Gazette was consolidated with his paper in 1883, and he became president of the company that published the combined journal under the name of the Commercial Gazette, also a recognized organ of the Republicans.

In 1890, he moved to Brooklyn, New York, where he edited the Standard Union, though he continued to write for the Commercial Gazette. President Benjamin Harrison nominated him for Minister to Germany, but the nomination was rejected by the Senate, perhaps due to editorials he had written accusing some senators of purchasing their seats.

At the start of the Spanish–American War, he became a war correspondent and went to the Philippines. His later years he spent writing books, mainly biographies, and contributing articles to magazines. He died at his home in Cincinnati on July 2, 1908, being survived by his wife and nine children. He was buried at Spring Grove Cemetery. His son Marshall, at one time United States consul in Birmingham, England, predeceased him.

Works
His reports from the 1860 presidential election have been collected as Three against Lincoln; Murat Halstead reports the caucuses of 1860, ed.  William Best Hesseltine. Baton Rouge, Louisiana State University Press, 1960. OCLC 337677.

He also wrote a number of books, including:

Life of Jay Gould: How he made his millions, 1892 
The story of Cuba her struggles for liberty; the cause, crisis and destiny of the Pearl of the Antilles, 1896 and 1898  
Our Country in War and Relations with All Nations, 1898
The story of the Philippines. Natural riches, industrial resources, statistics of productions, commerce and population; the laws, habits, customs, scenery, and conditions of the Cuba of the East Indies, and the thousand islands of the archipelagoes of India and Hawaii, with episodes of their early history ... Events of the war in the west with Spain, and the conquest of Cuba and Porto Rico, 1898   
Pictorial history of America's new possessions, the isthmian canals, and the problem of expansion, 1898  
Life and achievement of Admiral Dewey from Montpelier to Manila, 1899
Galveston the horrors of a stricken city ; portraying by pen and picture the awful calamity that befell the Queen city on the gulf and the terrible scenes that followed the disaster, 1900, reprinted 1980 
Life and Reign of Queen Victoria, 1901 (with A. J. Munson)  
The illustrious life of William McKinley: our martyred president, 1901
''War Between Russia and Japan, 1904

He contributed to these newspapers and magazines:
 Editor for Cincinnati Commercial (merged into Cincinnati Commercial Gazette)
 Editor for Brooklyn Standard Union
 Published articles for Cosmopolitan Monthly

References

External links

 
 
 

1829 births
1908 deaths
Writers from Cincinnati
American male journalists
American war correspondents
The Cincinnati Enquirer people
Burials at Spring Grove Cemetery